James Anthony Griffin (born June 13, 1934) is an American prelate of the Roman Catholic Church.  Griffin served as bishop of the Diocese of Columbus in Ohio from 1983 to 2004.  He previously served as an auxiliary bishop of the Diocese of Cleveland in Ohio from 1979 to 1983.

Biography
The fifth of seven children, Griffin was born in Fairview Park, Ohio, on June 13, 1934, to Thomas Anthony Griffin and Margaret Mary Hanousek. He attended St. Angela Merici School in Fairview Park, Ohio, and Saint Ignatius High School in Cleveland.

After high school, Griffin went to St. Charles College in Catonsville, Maryland  He finished his undergraduate studies at Borromeo College in Wickliffe, Ohio, receiving his Bachelor of Philosophy degree. Griffin then attended St. Mary Seminary in Cleveland.

Ministry 
On May 28, 1960, Bishop John Krol ordained Griffin to the priesthood for the Diocese of Cleveland in the Cathedral of St. John the Evangelist in Cleveland. After his ordination, Griffin was assigned as associate pastor at St. Jerome Parish in Cleveland. In 1961, Griffin was posted to Rome to study at the Pontifical Lateran University.  In 1963, he received his Licentiate of Canon Law magna cum laude from Lateran University.

After returning to Cleveland in 1963, Griffin served as secretary-notary of the Marriage Court of the diocese.  In 1965, he was appointed associate chancellor and vice chancellor. During that time, he attended night classes at Cleveland State University, receiving his Doctorate in Civil Law summa cum laude in 1972. Griffin then passed the Ohio Bar Exam. In 1973, Griffin was appointed chancellor of the diocese.

In January 1978, Bishop James Hickey named Griffin as vicar general and administrator pro tem of the Cathedral of St. John the Evangelist Parish. In April 1978, he was appointed pastor of St. William Parish in Euclid, Ohio.

Auxiliary Bishop of Cleveland
On June 30, 1979, Pope John Paul II appointed Griffin as an auxiliary bishop of the Diocese of Cleveland and titular bishop of Hólar. He was consecrated by then Archbishop James Hickey on August 1, 1979.

Bishop of Columbus
On February 7, 1983, John Paul II appointed Griffin as the tenth bishop of the Diocese of Columbus. He was installed on April 25, 1983.

In 1985, Griffin established the Foundation of the Catholic Diocese of Columbus and initiated the Legacy of Catholic Learning campaign in 1989 and Challenge In Changing Times campaign. He also established "Breaking The Silence" task force to reduce family violence. Griffin also served on a number of committees of the United States Conference of Catholic Bishops and was president of Catholic Relief Services (1991–1995).

In 1993, Griffin removed a priest, Phillip Jacobs, from his parish due to allegations that he had sexually abused a teenage boy.  The boy's family requested that the police not be notified, but years later Griffin made the notification.  When the Diocese of Victoria in British Columbia was considering hiring Jacobs, Griffin informed them about the allegations against him.  The Diocese of Victoria hired Jacobs anyway.  In 2019, Jacobs was arrested in Victoria, British Columbia for sexual abuse of minors.

Retirement 
On October 14, 2004, Griffin sent his letter of resignation as Bishop of Columbus to Pope John Paul, citing his arthritis. He was succeed by Bishop Frederick F. Campbell. In retirement, Griffin served as a weekend associate at St. Joan of Arc parish in Powell, Ohio, where he rents a condo. He continues to occasionally aid parishes in need of a priest in the Diocese and attends diocesan clergy gatherings.

See also
 Catholic Church hierarchy
 Catholic Church in the United States
 Historical list of the Catholic bishops of the United States
 List of Catholic bishops of the United States
 Lists of patriarchs, archbishops, and bishops

References

External links
Diocese of Columbus
Catholic-Hierarchy.org 
 Roman Catholic Diocese of Columbus Official Site

1934 births
Living people
People from Fairview Park, Ohio
Roman Catholic Diocese of Cleveland
Roman Catholic bishops of Columbus
20th-century Roman Catholic bishops in the United States
21st-century Roman Catholic bishops in the United States
St. Charles College alumni
Cleveland–Marshall College of Law alumni